Nile Valley University (NVU) or Wadi El-Neel University is a public university located in Khartoum, Sudan. It was founded in 1990.

It is a member of the Federation of the Universities of the Islamic World and the Association of African Universities.

References

Universities and colleges in Sudan